Flight 901  is an airline flight number that has had multiple accidents and incidents over the years. As so, the designation may refer to:

Austrian Airlines Flight 901, a Vickers Viscount crash near Moscow Sheremetyevo Airport, on 26 September 1960, 31 killed
Paradise Airlines Flight 901A, crashed on the city of Lake Tahoe, California, United States, March 1, 1964, killing all 85 occupants
Sterling Airways Flight 901, a Sud-Aviation Caravelle which experienced a landing gear failure which subsequently ruptured the fuel tank, killing 15 people on 15 March, 1974
Air New Zealand Flight 901, a McDonnell Douglas DC-10 collision with Mount Erebus, Antarctica, on 28 November 1979, 257 killed
Austral Líneas Aéreas Flight 901, a BAC One-Eleven crash near Buenos Aires, on May 7 1981, 31 killed
Scandinavian Airlines System Flight 901, a McDonnell Douglas DC-10 runway excursion at John F. Kennedy Airport, on 28 February 1984; all 177 survived
Vieques Air Link Flight 901A, crashed into the Atlantic Ocean off Vieques, Puerto Rico, August 2, 1984, killing all 9 occupants.
Alas Chiricanas Flight 901, a Embraer EMB 110 Bandeirante bombing in Panama, on 19 July 1994, 21 killed
Aviateca Flight 901, a Boeing 737-200 collision with San Vicente volcano, El Salvador, on 9 August 1995, 65 killed

See also
Flight 191
Flight 1 / 001
Flight 101

0901